Juicy Lucy may refer to:
 Juicy Lucy (band), a British blues rock band
 Juicy Lucy (Juicy Lucy album), 1969
 Juicy Lucy (Sal Salvador album), 1978

See also
 Jucy Lucy, a type of cheeseburger